Nemanja Marković (born 7 July 1915, date of death unknown) was a Yugoslav sports shooter. He competed in two events at the 1952 Summer Olympics.

References

External links
  

1915 births
Year of death missing
Yugoslav male sport shooters
Olympic shooters of Yugoslavia
Shooters at the 1952 Summer Olympics
Place of birth missing